The 1896 Championship of Australia was an Australian rules football match that took place on 12 June 1897.

The championship was contested by the premiers of the VFL,  and the premiers of the SAFL, .

The match was played at the Adelaide Oval in Adelaide, South Australia.

This was the last Championship of Australia match to be held until 1907.

References 

Championship of Australia
1896 in Australian sport
Championship of Australia
October 1896 sports events